The Thompson Court Apartments are a historic apartment building located in Portland, Oregon, United States. They represent an excellent example of architect Ewald T. Pape's steps toward making apartment living more appealing to the middle class. Built in 1929 for developer William K. Johnson, the building incorporates features such as two-story townhouse-type units, an L shape footprint to create greenspace, individual front and back entrances to each unit with individual addresses, and an overall emphasis on interior function over exterior design. While Pape was not unique in the use of these features, he stands out for utilizing all of them as a cohesive whole in his best buildings.

The building was entered on the National Register of Historic Places in 1996.

See also
National Register of Historic Places listings in Northeast Portland, Oregon
Burrell Heights Apartments
San Farlando Apartments

References

External links

, National Register of Historic Places cover documentation
Oregon Historic Sites Database entry

Modernist architecture in Oregon
Residential buildings completed in 1929
1929 establishments in Oregon
Apartment buildings on the National Register of Historic Places in Portland, Oregon
Irvington, Portland, Oregon
Portland Historic Landmarks